Hans Möhr (23 June 1916 – 28 August 2014) was a Swiss equestrian who competed in the 1960 Summer Olympics and in the 1964 Summer Olympics. He died in August 2014 at the age of 98.

References

External links
 

1916 births
2014 deaths
Equestrians at the 1960 Summer Olympics
Equestrians at the 1964 Summer Olympics
Olympic equestrians of Switzerland
Swiss male equestrians